Hudson Branch is a  long 2nd order tributary to Spring Creek in Kent County, Delaware.

Variant names
According to the Geographic Names Information System, it has also been known historically as:  
Berrytown Branch
Canterbury Branch
Cranberry Branch
Hudson Ditch
Hudson's Branch

Course

Watershed
Hudson Branch drains  of area, receives about 44.9 in/year of precipitation, has a topographic wetness index of 597.91 and is about 6.0% forested.

See also
List of Delaware rivers

Maps

References

Rivers of Delaware
Rivers of Kent County, Delaware
Tributaries of the Murderkill River